Kim Jin-young (born 2 March 1992) is a South Korean footballer who plays as goalkeeper for Hwaseong FC in K3 League.

Career
He was selected by Pohang Steelers in the 2014 K League draft.

References

External links 

1992 births
Living people
People from Gwangyang
Association football goalkeepers
South Korean footballers
Pohang Steelers players
Daejeon Hana Citizen FC players
K League 1 players
K League 2 players
Konkuk University alumni